Torsten Ankert (born June 22, 1988) is a German professional ice hockey defenceman. He is currently playing for the Iserlohn Roosters in the Deutsche Eishockey Liga (DEL).

Playing career
After coming up through the junior ranks within Kölner Haie, he made his professional debut in the DEL, with Haie, in the 2005–06 season. He played his first 12 professional seasons in Cologne, before leaving as a free agent to sign a two-year contract with fellow German outfit, Grizzlys Wolfsburg of the DEL on April 27, 2017.

In the final year of his contract with Wolfsburg, Ankert made just 7 appearances with the club in the 2018–19 season, before terminating his contract to join fellow DEL club, Krefeld Pinguine, on October 10, 2018. Establishing a role within the blueline of Krefeld, Ankert was signed to a two-year contract extension on February 5, 2019.

In his only full season with Krefeld in 2019–20, Ankert served as team captain, matching a career high with 12 points through 52 regular season games before the playoffs were cancelled due to the COVID-19 pandemic.

As a free agent from Krefeld after mutually terminating the final year of his contract, Ankert was signed by the Iserlohn Roosters on a two-year contract on 29 November 2020.

Career statistics

International

References

External links

1988 births
Living people
German ice hockey defencemen
Heilbronner Falken players
Iserlohn Roosters players
Kölner Haie players
Krefeld Pinguine players
Grizzlys Wolfsburg players
Sportspeople from Essen